Marcus Lucius Filley (February 28, 1912 – January 20, 1995) was a Major League Baseball pitcher who played in  with the Washington Senators. He batted and threw right-handed.

He was born in Lansingburgh, New York and died in Yarmouth, Maine.

External links

1912 births
1995 deaths
Major League Baseball pitchers
Baseball players from New York (state)
Washington Senators (1901–1960) players
Williams Ephs baseball players
Williams Ephs men's basketball players
People from Lansingburgh, New York
County judges in the United States
New York (state) state court judges
Burials at Oakwood Cemetery (Troy, New York)
People with Parkinson's disease